Lê Thị Phương (born 12 November 1983 in Hoằng Hóa, Thanh Hóa) is a retired Vietnamese pole vaulter.

On the continental scene she finished sixth at the 2003 Asian Championships, fifth at the 2005 Asian Championships and seventh at the 2006 Asian Games. She later won the silver medal at the 2009 Asian Indoor Games. On the regional scene she won the silver medals at the 2003, 2009, 2011 and 2013 Southeast Asian Games.

Her personal best jump is 4.20 metres, achieved at the 2011 Southeast Asian Games. This is the Vietnamese record. She also holds the Vietnamese indoor record with 4.00 metres, achieved at the 2009 Asian Indoor Games.

References

1983 births
Living people
Vietnamese pole vaulters
Athletes (track and field) at the 2006 Asian Games
Southeast Asian Games medalists in athletics
Southeast Asian Games silver medalists for Vietnam
Competitors at the 2003 Southeast Asian Games
Competitors at the 2009 Southeast Asian Games
Competitors at the 2011 Southeast Asian Games
Competitors at the 2013 Southeast Asian Games
Asian Games competitors for Vietnam
20th-century Vietnamese women
21st-century Vietnamese women